This is a list of countries by military expenditure in a given year. Military expenditure figures are presented in United States dollars based on either constant or current exchange rates.

Military expenditure, total
 Stockholm International Peace Research Institute (SIPRI) 2022 fact sheet
The first list is based on the SIPRI fact sheet which includes a list of the world's top 15 military spenders in 2022, based on current market exchange rates.

The second list is based on the 2022 edition of "The Military Balance" published by the International Institute for Strategic Studies (IISS) using average market exchange rates.

Russian and Chinese military spending are actually far higher than the chart due to captive markets and Purchasing Price Parity in those countries.

Military expenditure, share of GDP
This first list is a list of countries by military expenditure share of GDP—more specifically, a list of the top 15 countries by percentage share in recent years—the amount spent by a nation on its military as a share of its GDP.

The second list presents this as a share of the general government expenditure. The first list is sourced from the SIPRI for the year 2019 and from Military Balance 2017 published by International Institute for Strategic Studies for the year 2016. The second list is sourced only from the SIPRI for the year 2019.

As a share of GDP

Notes

See also

 Arms industry
 Military budget
 Past military expenditure by country
 List of countries by military expenditure per capita
 List of countries by Global Militarization Index

References

External links
 SIPRI military expenditure database (sipri.org)

Military
Military
Military comparisons lists of countries
Military economics
Military budgets